Lise Baker (born 17 October 1967) is a former New Zealand rugby union player. She represented New Zealand at RugbyFest 1990 where she debuted against the Netherlands on 26 August at Ashburton, New Zealand. She later played against the United States and a World XV's team.

References 

1967 births
Living people
New Zealand female rugby union players
New Zealand women's international rugby union players